Al-Arabi Sports Club is a Qatari sports club based in Doha. Founded in 1952, the most prominent team of the club is the football team that competes in the Qatar Stars League. The club's home ground is the 13,000-seat Grand Hamad Stadium, where they have played since their establishment.

Al-Arabi had their first major success in 1978, winning the Emir of Qatar Cup, and won various titles during the 1980s and 1990s. The club enjoyed their greatest period of success in those two decades, winning 17 major trophies. Domestically, Al-Arabi have won seven league titles, eight Emir of Qatar Cups, one Qatar Crown Prince Cup and six Qatar Sheikh Jassem Cups.

Al-Arabi's regular kit colours are red shirts and shorts with red socks. The club's crest has been changed several times in attempts to re-brand the club and modernise its image. The current crest, featuring a ceremonial falcon, is a modification of the one introduced in the early 1950s. They are known for having one of the largest fan bases in Qatar next to rivals Al Rayyan. In terms of championships won, they are the second most successful club on a local level after Al Sadd. Al-Arabi is known by various nicknames including "Dream Team", "The Red Devils", and "Century Club".

History

Foundation (1952–1990)
The club was founded in 1952 under the name "Al-Tahrir", making them the second oldest team in Qatar. In 1957, the club merged with Al-Wehda, a club founded which was founded on that year led by Mohamed Ali Ahmed Al-Ansari, after playing a friendly. They merged under the name of Al-Wehda. Al-Wehda did not play out Qatar or host any foreign clubs due to lack of financial possibilities for the club. In 1972, the club integrated under their current name, Al Arabi. The first president of the club was Ahmed Ali Ahmed Al-Ansari.

Al-Arabi was known for having one of the largest fan bases in all of Qatar, as well as other Gulf states, and was well-known overseas. Their popularity outside of the Middle East was bolstered by their achievements and national team players, until 2003 when it reached its peak with the signing of Argentine legend Gabriel Batistuta.

It placed 14th place in the International Federation of Football History & Statistics's 1901–2000 Asian Club of the Century.

Founders

Golden era (1990–2000)
The 1990s marked the start of a continuous chain of succession for Al-Arabi. The dream team had come to fruition with the likes of Marco Antônio and Richard Owebukeri who were the top scorers in the league at one point. Perhaps the most significant player was Mubarak Mustafa, who is still considered one of the best Qatari footballers in history. The team, impressing many with its versatile squad, took the Qatari league by storm, winning it 5 times out of 10. Not satisfied merely with local success, the team achieved runners-up position in the AFC Champions League in 1995.

They won their first Heir Apparent cup in 1997.

Decline (2000–2011)
The new century saw a significant slump in Al-Arabi's performance. Factors which impacted this may include the departure of Mubarak Mustafa and the increase of competitiveness from local clubs. In the 2002 season, Al Arabi finished in 7th place, the lowest position since its debut in the Qatar Stars League.

The arrival of Gabriel Batistuta in 2003 saw a glimpse of hope for Al-Arabi as they finished significantly higher in the league than the last 2 previous seasons, however they ended up finished 9th in the league at the end of the 2007 season, a new low. They did not win a single domestic title during this period, and had limited success in international competitions. Furthermore, they suffered their largest-ever defeat against Al Sadd that season when they were beaten 7–0, which resulted in the sacking of their coach Cabralzinho.

In 2006, due to popular dissent accosting the club president Sheikh Falah bin Jassim, there was an administration change which resulted in Sheikh Faisal bin Mubarak being elected as president.

Management crisis (2011–present)
The beginning of the 2011–12 season looked bright for Al Arabi, with the club winning their first domestic silverware in 13 years by defeating Umm Salal SC in the final of the 2011 Sheikh Jassem Cup. However, a string of bad results in the league resulted in the sacking of their coach, Paulo Silas.

They were also eligible to play in the 2012 AFC Champions League, which they were the first team to be eliminated from. During this period, the club had been in charge of 3 coaches in a span of 3 months. They infamously made history by being the first team since 2007 to lose every match in the group stage, as well as the first Qatari team to achieve this. As a result, the club's Director of Football, Mubarak Mustafa, announced his departure from the club. Furthermore, Dr. Abdullah al-Mal, president of the club, announced his retirement from sports. He was replaced by Hitme Bin Ali Al Hitmi. The fiscal budget of the club was reduced from 15 million riyals to 9 million riyals.

Al Arabi Fans Club

Al Arabi Fans Club was established on 21 October 2015, and it was created to support the team in all sports and to gather the fans to think of innovative ways to support and cheer the teams throughout the season. The same day the Fan Club was established, Al Arabi Club management decided to withhold the Number (1) jersey permanently from the list of the first team players and award it to the Fans, whom officially became the number (1) player in Al Arabi Club, Where Captain Masoud Zeraei waived his number (1) and awarded it to the Fans, who will retains its permanently under resolution. They have the most supporters in Qatar and that is one of the reasons why the gave them shirt number (1).

Stadium

Grand Hamad Stadium (Arabic: استاد حمد الكبير), also known as the Al-Arabi Sports Club Stadium, is a multi-purpose stadium in Doha, Qatar. It is currently used mostly for football matches. The football team Al-Arabi SC play there. The stadium holds 13,000 people. The stadium was used extensively during the 2006 Asian Games, and was a venue for several different sports; these include football, table tennis, rugby sevens and fencing. Iraq national football team played their 2014 FIFA World Cup qualification (AFC) games at the ground. Now they use the Stadium as a home for Yemen national football team in 2015 Fifa World qualification (AFC).

Rivalries

Al-Rayyan
Al-Rayyan and Al Arabi are often the most considered the most passionate sets of fans in Qatar. This derby known as "Fans Derby".

Head-to-head
From 1994 to 2017.

Al Sadd
This is the clash of Qatar's two most successful teams: Al Sadd and Al Arabi. For some fans, winning this derby is more noteworthy than winning the league itself. The derby is an important component of the country's culture.

Al Arabi always regarded themselves as the club of Qatar's working class, in contrast with the more upper-class support base of Al Sadd. The social class divide between the two fan bases eventually diminished.

Memorable matches
Bold indicates a win.

Head-to-head
From 1996 to 2017.

Crest

Shirt sponsors and manufacturers

Honours

International
Asian Club Championship
Runners-up (1): 1994–95

Domestic
Qatar Stars League
Champions (7): 1982–83, 1984–85, 1990–91, 1992–93, 1993–94, 1995–96, 1996–97
Emir of Qatar Cup
Champions (8): 1977–78, 1978–79, 1979–80, 1982–83, 1983–84, 1988–89, 1989–90, 1992–93
Qatar Crown Prince Cup
Champions (1): 1997
 Qatar FA Cup 
Champions (1) : 2021–22
Qatar Sheikh Jassem Cup
Champions (6): 1980, 1982, 1994, 2008, 2010, 2011

League results

Performance in AFC competitions
Asian Club Championship: 5 appearances
1987: Group stage (Top 8)
1993: Qualifying – 1st round
1995: Runners-up
1996: Group stage (Top 8)
1999: First Round

Asian Cup Winners' Cup: 2 appearances
1990–91: Second Round
1993–94: Semi-final

AFC Champions League: 1 appearance
2012: Group stage

Performance in UAFA competitions
Gulf Club Champions Cup: 7 appearances
1986: Runners-up
2002: Group stage
2006: Group stage
2011: Quarter-finals

Players
As of Qatar Stars League:

Unregistered players

Club staff
Technical and administrative staff
Last updated: April 2019.

Club officials

Managerial history
Present and past managers of Al-Arabi (incomplete):
(* denotes caretaker role)

Al-Wehda (1957–72)
 Tayeb Fadel (1957–??)
 Hassan Djidjo (1968–??)
 Ahmed Ali Al-Ansari (1969)

Al-Arabi (1972–present)

  Salah Daf'Allah (1972) (player–manager)
 Wagdi Jamal (1975–76)
 Jaber Yusif Al-Jassim (1976–78)
  Abdul Ameer Zainal (1978)
 Silas Gonçalves de Oliveira (1978–80)
  Hassan Mokhtar (1980)
 Procópio Cardoso (1981–83)
 João Francisco (1983–84)
 Sebastião (1984)
 Cabralzinho (1984–86)
 Sebastião (1986–??)
 Joseph Bowie (1988–89)
 Luis Alberto (1989–91)
 Oswaldo de Oliveira (1991–92)
 Zé Mário (1992)
 Colin Addison (1992–93)
 Zé Mário (1993)
 René Simões (1993–94)
 Oswaldo de Oliveira (1994–95)
 Cláudio Galbo Garcia (1995–96)
 Abdullah Saad (1996)
 Džemaludin Mušović (1996–97)
 Ernst (1997–98) 
 Ferdinando Teixeira (1998)
 Abdullah Saad (1998)
 Ednaldo Patricio (1998) 
 Anatoliy Azarenkov (1998–99)
 José Paulo Rubim (1999)
 Ednaldo Patricio (1999)
 Roald Poulsen (1999)
 Fuad Muzurović (1999)
 Abdullah Saad (1999–00) 
 Luis Santibáñez (2000)
 Adnan Dirjal (2000–01)
 Procópio Cardoso (2001)
 Abdullah Saad* (2001–02)
 Slobodan Santrač (2002–03)
 Carlos Roberto Pereira (2003)
 Cabralzinho (July 2003 – Nov 2003)
 Wolfgang Sidka (16 Nov 2003 – 30 June 2005)
 Ilie Balaci (June 2005 – July 2006)
 Henri Michel (1 July 2006 – 21 Oct 2006)
 Abdullah Saad* (Oct 2006 – Nov 2006)
 Srećko Juričić (1 Nov 2006 – 31 Dec 2006)
 José Romão (Feb 2007 – March 2008)
 Adilson Fernandes (March 2008 – April 2008)
 Zé Mário (July 2008 – Dec 2008)
 Luiz Carlos* (Dec 2008 – Jan 2009)
 Uli Stielike (5 Jan 2009 – 30 July 2010)
 Péricles Chamusca (1 July 2010 – 3 June 2011)
 Paulo Silas (9 June 2011 – 3 Jan 2012)
 Abdullah Saad* (1 Jan 2012 – 19 March 2012)
 Pierre Lechantre (19 March 2012 – 27 Sept 2012)
 Abdelaziz Bennij* (Sept 2012 – Oct 2012)
 Hassan Shehata (6 Oct 2012 – 6 Dec 2012)
 Abdelaziz Bennij (Dec 2012 – June 2013)
 Uli Stielike (5 June 2013 – Feb 2014)
 Paulo César Gusmão (Feb 2014 – 5 June 2014)
 Dan Petrescu (5 June 2014 – 1 Dec 2014)
 Daniel Carreño (1 Dec 2014 – 1 June 2015)
 Gianfranco Zola (11 July 2015 – 27 June 2016)
 Gerardo Pelusso (28 June 2016 – 1 November 2016)
 Kamal Akhlaf (2 November 2016 – 15 November 2016)
 Edison Aguirre (16 November 2016 – 19 January 2017)
 Oswaldo de Oliveira (20 January 2017 – 3 June 2017)
 Kais Yâakoubi (9 July 2017 – 9 November 2017)
 Luka Bonačić (10 November 2017 – 8 October 2018)
 Hatem Almoadab (9 October 2018 – 9 December 2018)
 Heimir Hallgrímsson (10 December 2018 – 30 Jun 2021)
 Younes Ali (1 July 2021 – )

Former managers with unknown dates
 Mohammed Atatash
 J. Mustafa
 Atha Al-Shatti
 Hilmi Al-Qut
 Medhat Mohammed
 Al-Makki
 Flamarion Nunes
 Ahmed Jassim Al-Jassim "Menotti"

Management

Presidents

 Muqbal bin Ali Al-Hitmi (1972–76)
 Abdulrahman Al Jaber Muftah (1976–78)
 Sultan Khaled Al-Suwaidi (1978–88)
 Dr. Abdullah Yusuf Al-Mal (1988–00)
 Sheikh Jassim bin Fahad bin Jassim Al-Thani (2000–01)
 Sheikh Khalifa bin Hamad bin Jaber Al-Thani (2001–02)
 Sheikh Falah bin Jassim Al-Thani (2002–06)
 Sheikh Faisal bin Mubarak Al-Thani (2006–09)
 Dr. Abdullah Yusuf Al-Mal (2009–12)
 Hitmi bin Ali Al-Hitmi (2012–2016)
 Sheikh Khalifa bin Hamad bin Jaber Al-Thani (2016–2020)
 Sheikh Tamim bin Fahad bin Jaber Al-Thani (2020–)

Club rankings

National ranking

Asian ranking

World ranking

References

External links
Official website

 
Arabi Sports Club
Arabi Sports Club
Arabi Sports Club
Articles which contain graphical timelines